The 1993 German Open was a men's tennis tournament played on outdoor clay courts. It was the 87th Hamburg Masters, and was part of the ATP Championship Series, Single Week category of the 1993 ATP Tour. It took place at the Rothenbaum Tennis Center in Hamburg, Germany, from 3 May through 10 May 1993. Sixth-seeded Michael Stich won the singles title.

Finals

Singles

 Michael Stich defeated  Andrei Chesnokov, 6–3, 6–7, 7–6, 6–4
It was Stich's second title of the year, and his ninth overall. It was his first Masters title of the year, and overall.

Doubles

 Paul Haarhuis /  Mark Koevermans defeated  Grant Connell /  Patrick Galbraith, 7–6, 6–4

References

External links
   
 ATP tournament profile